Cristina Portillo Ayala (born 30 December 1969) is a Mexican politician affiliated with the National Regeneration Movement (MORENA). As of 1997 she served as Deputy of the LVI and LIX Legislatures of the Mexican Congress and  serves as Deputy of the LXXIV Legislature of the Michoacán Congress.

References

1969 births
Living people
People from Morelia
Politicians from Michoacán
Women members of the Chamber of Deputies (Mexico)
Members of the Chamber of Deputies (Mexico)
Party of the Democratic Revolution politicians
Morena (political party) politicians
20th-century Mexican politicians
20th-century Mexican women politicians
21st-century Mexican politicians
21st-century Mexican women politicians
Deputies of the LIX Legislature of Mexico